The 2004 European Parliament election in Ireland was the Irish component of the 2004 European Parliament election. The voting was held on Friday, 11 June 2004. The election coincided with the 2004 local elections. The election was conducted under the single transferable vote.

Since the 1999 European Parliament election Ireland's entitlement had fallen from 15 seats to 13 seats due to European Union expansion and some constituencies boundaries and names were changed. 
Munster constituency lost County Clare and was reduced from 4 seats to 3 and renamed South
Connacht–Ulster gained County Clare and was renamed North-West
Leinster had no boundary changes but was reduced from 4 seats to 3 and renamed East
Dublin was unchanged

Results
The election was organised by city/county council area, the basis for the local elections being held simultaneously. Voters received different-coloured ballot papers for the European election, city/county council election, and a constitutional referendum, all of which went into the same ballot box and were separated by colour once the boxes arrived at the count centre for the city/county. Not all voters received all ballots as the franchises differ. The European ballots were all counted in one city/county, necessitating a second transportation of the separated ballots from the other city/county centres. For example, the East ballots were counted in Navan, County Meath.

MEPs elected

Voting details

Seats

See also
List of members of the European Parliament for Ireland, 2004–09 – List ordered by constituency
For the Northern Ireland European Parliament elections, see 2004 UK European Parliament election.

References

External links
ElectionsIreland.org – 2004 European Parliament (Ireland) election results
European Election News by European Election Law Association (Eurela)

European
Ireland
European 2004
2004 elections in the Republic of Ireland